Susan Wilson is an American author.

Susan or Sue Wilson may also refer to:
Sue Wilson, American politician
Susan Wilson, victim of video voyeurism, dramatized in television show Video Voyeur
Susan R. Wilson (born 1948), Australian statistician
Susan Wilson (director), New Zealand actor and director